Denis Edouardovich Shvedov (born 24 November 1981) is a Russian actor, best known for his role in The Major.

Biography
Denis Shvedov was born in Moscow, Russian SFSR, Soviet Union. After school he entered a tourism institute. However, he studied there without enthusiasm. Later his friend described his studies at a higher theatre school which inspired Denis to try this himself.

In 2006 Denis Shvedov graduated from the Mikhail Shchepkin Higher Theatre School, the course of N. Afonin. Then he was accepted into the troupe of the Russian Academic Youth Theater.

Career
He started to act in film in the year 2006. He began to get episodic and background roles. The first major role he played was in the film A Good Friend for All (2008) - a New Year's romantic comedy.

Further, there was a successful role in the film To Live. He played the role of Andrey, who is trying to escape from his pursuers. The psychological drama won the Grand Prix of the festival of Russian cinema in Sweden "Cinema Rurik", Denis Shvedov and Vladislav Toldykov received prizes for the best male role.

Wide popularity came to him in 2013 after the role of police major in the film The Major (2013) by Yuri Bykov. For this picture, he received an award for the main male role of the XI International Festival "Pacific Meridian".

More success followed Denis Shvedov when he starred in the action drama series Silver Spoon (2014). The plot of the television show is built around the tragedy of Igor - the son of a high-ranking man, a typical burner of life portrayed by Pavel Priluchny - a boy born with the silver spoon. His character is Danila Korolev, who starts a confrontation with the main character. In 2016, the second season of Silver Spoon aired on television.

Personal life
In 2016, Denis Shvedov and his unofficial wife Aleksandra Rozovskaya had a daughter.

Selected filmography

References

External links
 

1981 births
Living people
Russian male film actors
Russian male television actors
Russian male stage actors
21st-century Russian male actors
Male actors from Moscow